Alice Edith Isaacs, Marchioness of Reading,  (née Cohen;  – 30 January 1930) was the first wife of Rufus Isaacs, 1st Marquess of Reading, and a prominent philanthropist in colonial India. Her husband served as Viceroy and Governor-General of India, making her the Vicereine.

Isaacs was born in London to a Jewish family. She was the third daughter of Albert Cohen, a merchant in the City of London, and his wife, Elizabeth. She married Rufus Isaacs, then a newly qualified barrister, on 8 December 1887. He had considered being a stockbroker but his wife encouraged him to pursue a career in law. He was ultimately Solicitor-General, Attorney-General and Lord Chief Justice.

Her title successively changed from Mrs Isaacs to Lady Isaacs on her husband's knighthood in 1910, Baroness Reading on his ennoblement in 1914, Viscountess Reading in 1916, the Countess of Reading in 1917, and finally the Marchioness of Reading in 1926.

In 1921, Lord Reading was appointed Viceroy of India. He was reluctant to accept, as his wife's health was delicate, but she persuaded him. She accompanied him to India and, despite continuing poor health, served prominently as Viceregal Consort. She also threw herself into charitable work, particularly with Indian women and children. She established the Women of India Fund in 1921 and National Baby Week in 1923, as well as supporting many existing charities. In 1926 she campaigned to construct a standard hospital in Peshawar, in place of Agerton Hospital. The new hospital was subsequently named as Lady Reading Hospital. Later, upon the retirement of her husband in 1926, they returned to England.

She was appointed Dame Grand Cross of the Order of the British Empire (GBE) in the 1920 civilian war honours and Companion of the Order of the Crown of India (CI) on 14 March 1921, the latter being a traditional honour for the Vicereine of India. She was awarded the Kaiser-i-Hind Medal in gold in 1924. She died of cancer in 1930, aged 64.

Footnotes

1860s births
1930 deaths
British marchionesses
British women in World War I
Deaths from cancer in England
English humanitarians
English Jews
English philanthropists
People from the City of London
Recipients of the Kaisar-i-Hind Medal
Companions of the Order of the Crown of India
Dames Grand Cross of the Order of the British Empire
Viceregal consorts of India
Wives of knights